The 2007 North Texas Mean Green football team represented the University of North Texas in the 2007 NCAA Division I FBS football season . The team was led by its new head coach Todd Dodge.  He replaced Darrell Dickey, who was fired after going 3–9 in 2006. Dodge was regarded as one of the nation’s most successful high school football coaches amassing a 98–11 record overall at Carroll High School in Southlake, Texas. He was named National Coach of the Year by Schutt Sports in 2004 and by USA Today in 2005.  His Southlake program produced five consecutive offensive players of the year in Texas. Dodge is also regarded by many FBS coaches as one of the nation's premiere offensive minds in developing a unique and effective scheme in his variation of the spread offense, in the much the same vein as Steve Spurrier and Mouse Davis.  While at Southlake, Dodge helped the University of Missouri to implement his scheme.

The Mean Green played their home games on campus at Fouts Field in Denton, Texas.

Preseason

Coaching
After being named as head coach, Todd Dodge announced in early January the hiring of nine new assistant coaches. The new staff's combined resumes include 26 bowl appearances, 14 bowl victories, 18 high school state titles, a Super Bowl title and a BCS national title. New defensive coordinator Ron Mendoza, new offensive coordinator Todd Ford and new special teams Robert Drake all come with Dodge from Carroll High School where they coached the Dragons to 5 state titles. After a tenure in the NFL with the Pittsburgh Steelers, and University of Houston Cougars, Butch LaCroix, former North Texas assistant from 1987–1993, rejoins the Mean Green staff for a second duration as cornerback’s coach. For the past four seasons at the University of Tulsa, new offensive line coach Spencer Leftwich returns to North Texas at the same position he previously held. Former North Texas leading receiver, new receivers coach Clayton George, also served under Dodge until becoming head coach at Hillcrest High School. 2003 Division I assistant coach of the year, new safeties coach Chuck Petersen, after spending 17 years with United States Air Force Academy Falcons. Former Texas Longhorns and St. Louis Rams player and later Texas Longhorns graduate assistant, Derek Lewis, will coach defensive ends. After spending the last two seasons at Louisiana Tech, new running backs coach Shelton Gandy, also was  running backs coach for his alma mater Southern Mississippi.

Spring Game

Stadium Improvements
Prior to the first home game, Fouts Field received several improvements. With paint donated by local Pittsburgh Paints, the student spirit organization, Talons, repainted the entire stadium. Other changes included renovated bathrooms, signage, asphalt in and around the entry gates. This is the largest improvement to Fouts since replacement of the field's Astroturf prior to the 2005 season.

Uniform changes 
On August 4, 2007, North Texas unveiled changes to their uniforms during the Kickoff Cookout at the Mean Green Athletic Center. For away games, instead of all green jerseys, the team will have white shirts with white pants. Home games will feature the university's new kelly green on top and have the same white pants. The numbers and letters will be green for away games and white for home with a black outline. The most notable change is the reintroduction of a white helmet not worn since alumni "Mean" Joe Greene played for North Texas in the late 1960s.

Schedule

Game summaries

Oklahoma

The Mean Green traveled to Norman, Oklahoma, for the season opener against the Oklahoma Sooners. Within :32 seconds of the first quarter, the Sooners scored on their opening drive. The Sooners put up 49 unanswered points until North Texas kicker Thomas Moreland completed the first field goal of the season late in the third quarter. After the Sooners racked up two more touchdowns, freshman (QB) Giovanni Vizza threw the Mean Green's only touchdown of the game to wide receiver (WR) Casey Fitzgerald early in the fourth quarter. The game ended with a final score of 79–10. The Mean Green finished with 15 yards rushing and 232 yards passing. Both starting quarterback junior Daniel Meager and freshman Giovanni Vizza saw game time with Meager being replaced by Vizza  during the third quarter. (RB) Micah Mosley led the Mean Green in rushing 5 carries and 15 yards. Contradicting the final score, Oklahoma head coach Bob Stoops admitted being worried about running up the score criticizing the Mean Green's no huddle offense. Coach Dodge handled the loss well and was quoted he held no ill-feelings towards to Sooners for the lopsided win.

North Texas set a new record of most points given up in a single game. It also marked the second-largest margin of loss in a single game for the Mean Green.

SMU

Florida Atlantic

Arkansas

Louisiana-Lafayette

Louisiana-Monroe

Troy

In the Troy University Trojans homecoming game on October 20, 2007, the Troy Trojans showed reason why they are number one in the Sun Belt Conference. The North Texas Mean Green, who had an abysmal 0-for-4 on fourth downs, were held to just seven points, which came with 2:55 left in the third quarter.

Middle Tennessee

Navy

Statistics

With 136 total points, the game set the NCAA Division I-FBS record for most total points scored in a regulation-length game.  The previous record for college football's top division (previously called Division I-A) was 133 points during San Jose State's 70 63 win over Rice in 2004.  In addition to the Division I-FBS total points record set by Navy vs. North Texas, the 94 first-half points and the 63 combined points in the second quarter, both set college records.

Navy came into the game with the best rushing offense, statistically, of any team in the nation.  They set a  school record by running for 572 yards with eight rushing touchdowns in the game.  The Midshipmen tied another school record by scoring at least 30 points for the eighth consecutive game.

Todd Dodge said, "I have never been a part of a game quite like this.  I knew that we would have to score on nearly every possession and maybe steal a possession or two with turnovers."

Arkansas State

WKU

Florida International

The Mean Green lose to FIU. FIU ended a 23-game losing streak at the expense of the Mean Green. It also marked the last official college football game at the Orange Bowl.

References

North Texas
North Texas Mean Green football seasons
North Texas Mean Green football